Elis Gruffydd (1490–1552), sometimes known as "The soldier of Calais", was a Welsh chronicler, transcriber, and translator. He is known foremost for his massive chronicle Cronicl o Wech Oesoedd (Chronicle of the Six Ages), which covers the history of the world from the beginning of Adam and Eve up to the year 1552 and contains the earliest text of the Tale of Taliesin. He is also well known for his eyewitness account of England's 1543 war with France in his journal transcribed in Elis Gruffydd and the 1544 'Enterprise' of Paris and Boulogue. His presence on the battlefield has given insight into the development of protests against the campaign. Thomas Jones says "despite his long years of service in France and London, [Gruffydd] was deeply interested in the oral traditions and written literature of his native land. He quotes Welsh englynion and proverbs, records a few folk-tales, and transcribes Welsh texts from such MSS as he had at his disposal". Gruffydd is an excellent source in uncovering lost and obscure traditions and he serves as a harmoniser for Welsh traditions appearing in different ages by the same poet, such as Merlin and Taliesin.

Life 
Elis Gruffydd was born in Upper Gronant in the parish of Llanasa, Flintshire. More famously Elis Gruffydd began his life in Flintshire, Wales as the younger son of a cadet of a gentry's family. At a young age he inherited 24 acres of land from his uncle Siôn ap Dafydd. It has been assumed that his family was related to the Mostyns, a family of considerable wealth and influence during the era. In 1510 he travelled across the border and joined the English army, fighting in Holland and Spain. He may have been attracted to London because of the Tudor dynasty, whose closest Welsh cousins were the Mostyns and who offered opportunities for the Welsh. His neighbour Sir Huw Conwy of Botryddan was already high in the royal service and worked as the treasurer of Calais from 1492 to 1517.

By 1518 he began working for Sir Robert Wingfield, a gentleman from Suffolk, mostly likely to solve his financial issues. The Wingfield family was one of the most distinguished families of government servants under the early Tudors. In 1520 he was working at the Wingfield home in Calais, where he witnessed the Battle of the Golden Field of the Cloth. From his experience here Gruffydd left detailed soldier-eye descriptions on the conditions and men on this campaign. He accompanied Wingfield on various diplomatic missions abroad, most notably around France, which accounts for his extensive knowledge on French culture and history. On an expedition in 1523, Gruffydd accompanies Wingfield to London, giving vivid descriptions of Thomas Wolsey in the Court of Star Chamber.

Between 1524 and 1529, he was residing in London as caretaker of Wingfield Place. The nature of Gruffydd's work was never revealed. In his own Chronicle he describes duties that took him outside London: to Essex and Kent in 1525 and to Poplar in 1527. During his stay in London he observed many political figures and witnessed events at the Court of Star Chamber. It was during this time that he began penning his first extensive work Cardiff MS 5, also known as Phillipps 10823, which featured a collection of prose and poetry based loosely of the late medieval tradition. On 27 January 1529, Gruffydd travelled back to Calais, where his master Sir Robert Wingfield was serving as deputy governor. Henceforth he was known as "The soldier of Calais". Here he wrote two more works called Castell yr Iechyd, or The Fortress of Health, which was a collection of Welsh translations of medical works, and Cronicl o Wech Oesoedd, Gruffydd's immense chronicle of the world. This chronicle was written in Welsh, despite his long residence in England and France, consisting in large part of translations and adaptations of English and French sources. The fact that he includes in the work a version of Ystoria Taliesin, is highly significant for medievalists, as this is the earliest surviving copy of the legend of Taliesin's birth and acquisition of the gift of vision. Though he recorded it in the sixteenth century, Gruffydd gives evidence of earlier sources, hinting toward a ninth-century origination date.

He spent the remainder of his life in Calais transcribing various manuscripts, mostly likely from the Wingfield family library. He lived as a bachelor soldier and married a Calais girl named Elizabeth Manfielde. He inherited some property through her and they had two children together. As the Protestant wave swept Europe, Gruffydd converted from Catholicism and became a convinced Protestant some time around the 1540s. Deeply influenced by Thomas Cromwell, Gruffydd was the first Welsh Protestant to leave a record of his religious views. The exact date of his death is unknown, but the last date in his chronicle is 1552. It is, however, generally believed that he was still present in Calais when the city was retaken in 1558.

Chronicler 

Although Elis Gruffydd spent the majority of his life as a soldier and an administrative officer, it was his work as a chronicler, transcriber, and translator that made him known.  Though he was a soldier for the Tudor empire, he showed a continual interest in the welfare of Wales. His career as a military officer paralleled to his career as a writer, inspiring him to create an English style chronicle for his own Welshmen.

Gruffydd's most important work was his famous chronicle of the world, Chronicle of Six Ages of the World. Completed around 1552, the some 2,400-folio page work is divided into two parts. The first, NLW Manuscript 5276D describes the history of the world in six ages from Creation to the Christian Age. The second portion, labelled NLW Manuscript 3054D tells the history of England from the reign of William the Conqueror in 1066 up to its published date in 1552. This part of the manuscript gave a look into Gruffydd's own life, as well as the lives of other Welsh people who emigrated from London to Calais. It also showed Welsh attitudes toward the Tudor kings Henry VII and Henry VIII, giving insight into Welsh history in an English cultural context. The work gave extensive narratives in written Welsh language, a trait scarcely seen before. Gruffydd commonly used himself as a source, which became evident further into the text. Frequently referencing his own experiences with Sir Robert Wingfield, he records important events such as meetings between King Henry VIII of England and King Francis I of France on the Field of Cloth of Gold, as well as trials within the Court of Star Chamber. The immense document contains the earliest version of the Taliesin Saga, as well as the story of Owain Glyn Dwr, Myth Huaw ap Caw and Arthur, Legend of Merlin, Wife Maelgyn and the Ring, and History of Llywelyn ap Lorwerth and Cynwrig from Trefriw Red. This document is one of the largest works ever written in the Welsh language, as well as Gruffydd's last work. Today it resides at the National Library of Wales.

Elis Gruffydd's perhaps second most important work was a journal he kept during Henry VIII's war in France. Elis Gruffydd and the 1544 'Enterprises' of Paris and Boulogne was transcribed by M. Bryn Davies. This journal gives remarkable detail into the military, social, and political life of war seen from the viewpoint of a soldier, a perspective rarely observed. As a member of the "Poor Bloody Infantry", Gruffydd revealed sympathies with the sufferings of the soldiers rather than their commanders, who he regularly barraged with harsh criticism. His narrative showed his opinionated, well-informed, and experienced view of the world.

Works 

 Phillipps 10823 (Cardiff MS 5) [1527]
 The Fortress of Health (Castell yr Iechlyd) (Cwrtmawr MS 1) [1548/9]
 Chronicle of the Six Ages (Cronicl o Wech Oesoedd) [1552]

NLW MS. 5276D

NLW MS. 3054D

 The Tale of Hercules (Ystoria Erewlf)
 The Tale of the Bare Ship (Ystori'r Llong Foel)
 The Twelve Matters of Belief (Deuddeg Pwnc y Ffdd)
 The Legend of Huail ap Caw and Arthur (Chwedl Huail ap Kaw ac Arthur)
 The Legend of Merlin and the Three-fold Death (Chwedyl Myrddin a'r Marwolaeth)
 The Death of Merlin (Marwolaeth Myrdin)
 The Tale of Taliesin (Ystoria Taliesin)
 Merlin and the Five Dreams of Gwenddydd (Myrddin a Phum Breaddwyd Gwenddydd)
 Maelgwn's Wife and the Ring ("Gwraig Maelgwn a'r Fodrwy")
 The History of Llywelyn ap Iorwerth and Cynwrig from Trefriw Red (Hanes Llywelyn ap Iorwerth a Cynwrig Goch o Drefriw)

References

Sources 

Brewer, D.S. (2005). The Fortunes of King Arthur. Trowbridge: Cromwell Press. .

Davies, M. Bryn. (2003). Elis Gruffydd and the 1544 ‘Enterprises’ of Paris and Boulogne. Surrey: The Pike and Shot Society. .

“Elis Gruffudd’s Chronicle”. llgc.org.uk (2010-12-08). Retrieved on 2011-11-05.

Evens, Dyfed Llyold. “Elis Gruffudd's Cronicl o Wech Oesoedd (Chronicle of the Six Ages)”. celtnet.org.uk (2011). Retrieved on 2011-11-05.

Ford, Patrick, K. (1976). Viator: Medieval and Renaissance Studies. Berkeley: University of California Press. .

Hunter, Thomas Gerald. (1995). “The Chronicle of Elis Gruffydd”. The Department of Celtic Languages and Literatures, Harvard University: 2–38.

Jones, Thomas. (1960). “A Welsh Chronicler in Tudor England”. Welsh History Review/ Cylchgrawn Hanes Cymru, 1:1: 3–16.

Morgan, Prys. (1971–72). “Elis Gruffudd of Granant-Tudor Chronicler Extraordinary”. Cyhoeddiadau Cymdeithas Hanes Sir y Fflint/ Flintshire Historical Society publications, Vol. 25: 9–20.

Phillips, Gervase. (2001). “To Cry ‘Home! Home!’: Mutiny, Morale, and Indiscipline in Tudor Armies”. The Journal of Military History Vol. 65, No. 2: 313–332.

Welsh-language writers
Welsh antiquarians
People from Flintshire
1490 births
1552 deaths